Manuel Villareal is a Filipino sailor. He competed in the Finn event at the 1968 Summer Olympics.

References

External links
 

Year of birth missing (living people)
Living people
Filipino male sailors (sport)
Olympic sailors of the Philippines
Sailors at the 1968 Summer Olympics – Finn
Place of birth missing (living people)